Kingsize Soundlabs are three recording studios in Los Angeles County, California, run by record producer Dave Trumfio.

Background 
Located in the Silverlake, Glassell Park, and Atwater Village areas of Los Angeles. The Glassell Park studio is in the "Rock Block". Kingsize Soundlabs has recorded bands such as American Standards, Jesus and Mary Chain, Built to Spill, Wilco, The Vines, American Music Club, Patrick Park, Moving Units, Rilo Kiley, The Sleepy Jackson, The Spinto Band, Imperial Teen, Eleni Mandell, Pela, Aggrolites, Slightly Stoopid, Los Abandoned, Lostprophets, Amateurs, Steve Reynolds, Kristin Mooney, E for Explosion, Booker T and Jolie Holland, Mavis Staples and Sierra Leone All Stars, Attack Attack, and Papa vs Pretty.

Studio B 

Studio B is used by producer Rob Schnapf for his "MANT studio".

References

External links 
 

Recording studios in California